Hugh Donnelly Fisher (born 9 January 1944) is a Scottish former professional footballer who played for Southampton between 1966 and 1976 and was a substitute in the 1976 FA Cup Final.

Career

Early career
Born in Pollok, Glasgow, Hugh Fisher is the son of another professional footballer Peter Fisher. He was playing for his local youth team when he was spotted by Blackpool and signed by them in August 1962, aged 18.

At Blackpool, then playing in the First Division, he played in midfield alongside Alan Ball.

On 31 December 1966, he was part of the Blackpool side that defeated Southampton 5–1 at The Dell, and scored the opening goal. This was Blackpool's only away win of the 1966–67 season, in which they finished bottom with only 21 points and were relegated.

He played 55 League games in his five seasons at Blackpool, scoring once.

Southampton
After defeat by Blackpool, Southampton manager Ted Bates tried to sign a player to boost their midfield, having an offer of £75,000 for Howard Kendall rejected by Preston. He then turned his attention to Fisher, who had helped to rip Southampton apart on New Year's Eve, and he was signed for £35,000 at the beginning of March, making his debut (together with goalkeeper Eric Martin) on 18 March 1967 away to Everton (who by then had themselves signed Kendall). He made a good debut and remained ever-present to the end of the 1966–67 season when Saints narrowly avoided relegation in their first season in Division 1, thanks largely to the goal-scoring talents of Ron Davies (37 league goals) and Martin Chivers (22 league goals).

In 1967–68 he was the regular at No. 4, but the following season he lost his place to Fred Kemp. By November 1969 he had re-established himself as first choice in midfield and was ever-present in the 1970–71 season as Saints finished 7th in the First Division.

On 2 October 1971, he broke his leg in a collision with Arsenal's goalkeeper Bob Wilson, thus ending a sequence of 50 consecutive appearances. Fisher was then side-lined for the rest of the season, when again Saints struggled to avoid relegation. He was restored to the starting line-up the following season and barely missed a game over the next 3 seasons as Saints finally slipped back into Division 2 in 1974.

During the summer of 1975, he played in the United States with Denver Dynamos in the NASL.

His greatest moment in a Southampton shirt came in the 1975–76 season. The Saints were having a mediocre season in Division 2, but on 3 January 1976, in an F.A. Cup third round match at the Dell, Saints were 1–0 down against Aston Villa when, in the 89th minute of the game, the ball was crossed into the area by David Peach. The ball was touched on by Pat Earles to Mick Channon and back to Fisher, who shot the ball into the goal through a crowd of defenders. This goal, Fisher's first for 16 months, kept his side in the competition.

Southampton progressed through the remaining rounds of the cup to reach the final. Fisher had played in all the rounds up to the semi-final, but had to withdraw from the starting line-up, in favour of Paul Gilchrist, with a pelvic strain. For both the semi-final and final on 1 May 1976 Fisher was on the bench, as Southampton went on to win their first trophy.

At the start of the following season, Fisher was still carrying the injury that had prevented him playing in the cup final, but he still appeared in most of the league games until 20 November 1976, when he played what was to be his last game for Southampton in a 3–1 home defeat by Bolton Wanderers. By this time, Steve Williams was beginning to make a name for himself in midfield and shortly afterwards Saints signed Fisher's former Blackpool teammate, Alan Ball. As the pairing of Ball and Williams became a virtual fixture in midfield, Fisher became a regular in the reserves, together with several other members of the team that had won the cup only a season earlier.

In all he had played 366 games for Southampton scoring 11 goals over ten years there.

Southport
In March 1977, after ten years with Southampton, Fisher joined Fourth Division Southport as player-manager. He played in Southport's remaining 15 games of the 1976–77 season, and only missed one game in the following season. Together with cup games, he made 66 appearances for Southport in a period of 14 months. Unfortunately, however, his efforts were not enough to keep Southport in the Football League and they were not re-elected to the Fourth Division at the end of the 1977–78 season and were replaced by Wigan Athletic.

After football
As a result of Southport leaving the Football League, Hugh was out of a job, although he played as a semi-professional for various Hampshire clubs, including a season with Waterlooville, but finally retired from football in 1980.

By this time he was working as a sales representative for Schweppes before moving on to Watney Mann and then to Newcastle Courage. He is currently living in Bishop's Waltham, Hampshire with his wife, Claudia.

Honours
Southampton
 FA Cup: 1976

References

 
 

1944 births
Living people
Footballers from Glasgow
Association football midfielders
Scottish footballers
Scottish football managers
Blackpool F.C. players
North American Soccer League (1968–1984) players
Denver Dynamos players
Southampton F.C. players
Southport F.C. players
Waterlooville F.C. players
Southport F.C. managers
Scottish expatriate footballers
Expatriate soccer players in the United States
English Football League players
Andover F.C. players
Basingstoke Town F.C. players
Scottish expatriate sportspeople in the United States
FA Cup Final players